"The Rose of Jericho" is an instrumental single by experimental trance musician BT, his first from his sixth studio album, These Hopeful Machines.

Track listing

Production and recording
The main synth section of "The Rose of Jericho" was created with an Oberheim 4 voice analog synth layered with Native Instruments FM8, later processed through a Stutter Edit plug in he created on Sonik Architects.

Release
Three years after the release of his fifth studio album, This Binary Universe, BT released the first part of the single through Nettwerk and Black Hole Recordings exclusively on digital music retailer Beatport seven days after its initial due date on June 2. The motif behind the June 9 release date was due to Sonifi, an innovative iPhone application created by his software company Sonik Architects. Earlier in the year, BT played twelve seconds of the song on his 12 Seconds website. A second release has been announced for June 23 through the same record labels. BT conducted a live interview through uStream on the day of the single's release, in which he announced a remix contest for "The Rose of Jericho" on Beatport; the winning remix would be released as part of a bundle.

Music video

The music video for "The Rose of Jericho" was created by DOSE Productions (Sam Hayles). The video includes images of the actual rose of Jericho (seen right) and a tulip, as well as the golden ratio, a motif used in the video for BT's earlier song "1.618". A day prior to the June 9 release, the music video to the single was uploaded to Black Hole's YouTube page.

Commercial performance

Charts
Within a day of its release, "BT's Deus ex Machina Album Mix"  reached position 19 on the Top 100 Progressive house tracks on Beatport at 10:00 am (UTC−6). At the same hour on June 11 it reached position 14, followed by the "Sultan & Ned Shepard Remix" on position 19 in the same chart. On June 12 BT's mix finally entered the Beatport Top 100 downloads, the day after it reached position 63 at noon (UTC−6) and at the same time it held position 9 on the Top 100 Progressive house tracks; Meanwhile, in the Electro house chart the "Robbie Rivera New Juicy Music Mix" was in position 24. On Beatport's Top 100 downloads, BT's mix kept a steady increase in the charts reaching position 47 at noon (UTC−6) on June 15; on June 16 it reached position 39 at noon on the same time zone as well as position 5 on the Progressive house chart. On June 17 BT's album mix disappeared from the Beatport Top 100 and began to fall down from position 5 on the Progressive house chart to position 13 at 2:00 pm (UTC−6). The song remains outside of Beatport's top 100 and its position is 15 on the Progressive house chart for June 18 at noon (UTC−6).

Radio and podcasts
BT's album mix was featured on Markus Schulz's Global DJ Broadcast radio show for June 11. Sultan and Shepard's mix was played on Ferry Corsten's "Corsten's Countdown" on June 17 and was well received by the public. On June 18, BT's album mix was also played on Armin van Buuren's A State Of Trance and on Black Hole's own radio show.

References

2009 singles
Black Hole Recordings singles
BT (musician) songs
2009 songs
Nettwerk Records singles
Trance instrumentals